The 2018 Big Ten Men's Lacrosse Tournament was held May 3 and May 5 at U-M Lacrosse Stadium in Ann Arbor, Michigan. The winner of the tournament received the Big Ten Conference's automatic bid to the 2018 NCAA Division I Men's Lacrosse Championship. Four teams from the Big Ten conference competed in the single elimination event. The seeds were determined based upon the teams' regular season conference record. Johns Hopkins won the tournament, beating Maryland 13-10.

Standings
Only the top four teams in the Big Ten Conference advanced to the Big Ten Conference Tournament.

Not including Big Ten Tournament and NCAA tournament results

Schedule

Bracket
U-M Lacrosse Stadium – Ann Arbor, Michigan

Awards 

 MVP: Brock Turnbaugh, Johns Hopkins, Goalie
 All-Tournament Team:
 Logan Wisnauskas, Maryland, Attack
 Connor Kelly, Maryland, Midfield
 Matt Neufeldt, Maryland, Defense
 Brock Turnbaugh, Johns Hopkins, Goalie
 Kyle Marr, Johns Hopkins, Attack
 Cole Williams, Johns Hopkins, Attack
 Patrick Foley, Johns Hopkins, Defense
 Robert Kuhn, Johns Hopkins, Defense
 Alex Bronzo, Rutgers, Defense
 Erik Evans, Ohio State, Defense

References

External links 
 2018 Big Ten Tournament Central
 Tournament Preview

2018 NCAA Division I men's lacrosse season
Big Ten Conference Men's Lacrosse
Big Ten men's lacrosse tournament